Eugnosta fernandoana is a species of moth of the family Tortricidae. It is found in Mexico (Tamaulipas).

The wingspan is about 12.5 mm. The ground colour of the forewings is whitish grey, but white along the edges of the markings, in the mid-part of the costa and along vein CuA2. The remaining area is suffused and sparsely strigulated with grey. The hindwings are dark brownish grey.

Etymology
The species name refers to the type locality.

References

Moths described in 2007
Eugnosta